Santosh Shrestha (Nepali: सन्तोष श्रेष्ठ) (born 1981) is a Nepalese musician, singer and song writer. He was awarded the Natikaji National Music Award by President Bidya Devi Bhandari. He has also made a  Guinness World Records in 2020 after performing music in 12 languages ​​of the world. Since 2062, the number of solo albums he has composed has reached 29.

Early life
He was born in Dang Nepal.

Career 
In 2062 (BS) he started his musical carrier. His popular songs include "Timle parai thane pachhi", "Aauchhi bhani nisthuri le", "Timile bhulna sake pani, and "Timro dilma chot lagda". He has composed over 700 film tunes and hundreds of folk songs He composed music in twelve languages. Guinness World Records awarded Shrestha a certificate as a record-breaking musician. His music has been recorded in 14 languages, including Nepali, Hindi, Chinese, Japanese, English, Russian, Korean, French, Spanish, Italian, German, and Thai. Sargam composed and recorded Nepali songs A Santi. He broke another Guinness World Record by writing music in 50 languages. He earlier set a Guinness World Record by writing music in 12 languages.

Awards

Album

Music

Honors

References 

Nepalese songwriters
Living people
1981 births